Armen Avanessian (born 1973) is an Austrian philosopher, literary theorist, and political theorist. He has taught at the Free University of Berlin, among other institutions, and held fellowships in the German departments of Columbia University and Yale University. His work on Speculative realism and Accelerationism in art and philosophy has found a wide audience beyond academia.

Life 
Of Armenian descent, Armen Avanessian was born 1973 in Vienna studied philosophy and political science under Jacques Rancière in Paris. He completed his dissertation, 'Phenomenology of Ironic Spirit: Ethics, Poetics, and Politics in Modernity', under the supervision of conservative theorist Karl Heinz Bohrer at the University of Bielefeld. For several years, he worked as a free-lance journalist, journal editor (Le Philosophoire, Paris), and in the publishing industry in London.

From 2007 to 2014, he taught in the Peter Szondi Institute for Comparative Literature at the Free University of Berlin. In 2011 he was a visiting fellow in the German Department at Columbia University and in 2012 in the German Department at Yale University. Since 2013, he has held visiting appointments at a number of art schools (in Nuremberg, Vienna, Basel, Copenhagen, California). In 2014, he became the chief editor at Merve Verlag, a Berlin publisher specializing in philosophy and political theory. In 2011, Armen Avanessian founded the bilingual research and publication platform Speculative Poetics that brings together philosophers, writers, and artists from across the world around the idea of a new theoretical discipline in the making.

Career 
Following his dissertation, which had already explored phenomena at the intersection of art, politics, and philosophy, Avanessian focused on developing a new approach in literary theory and philosophy of language. Collaborating with colleagues such as Anke Hennig, he began working in 2011 on connecting new speculative-ontological approaches with twentieth-century philosophies of language, which resulted most notably in two co-written books, 'Present Tense: A Poetics' (2012, English translation 2015) and 'Metanoia: A Speculative Ontology of Language, Thinking, and the Brain' (2014, English translation forthcoming 2016). Moreover, he played a central role in bringing accelerationism into German-language political philosophy. In 2015, Wired Magazine named him an intellectual innovator, noting in particular his concern with post-capitalist ideas.

Avanessian's work has come to be situated primarily outside the academy. It includes widely discussed statements on current affairs such as the refugee crisis, numerous lectures in the international art and culture scene, as well as a large number of interviews and intellectual portraits. Beyond the classical academic mainstream, Avanessian has repeatedly managed to introduce new concepts and theoretical constellations into public discourse. These consist partly of neologisms, partly of concepts used in smaller circles, which Avanessian's work as editor re-produces for the German-language context. Examples include "speculative realism", "acceleration", "xenofeminism", "hyperstition", and, most recently, the concept of the "time complex: postcontemporary". Hyperstition, moreover, is not just another concept, it also designates a method, namely the actualization in the present, from out of the future, of ideas or fictions.

Avanessian's books have been translated into several languages, including English, Russian, Dutch, Spanish, and French.

Literary Studies 
Avanessian's early publications are mostly scholarly books and essays on linguistics, semantics, and literary studies. His philosophical breakthrough came with the edited volumes on 'Speculative Realism' (Realism Now) and the German edition of the reader, '#Acceleration'. His move to Merve has emphasized his focus on editing current, not yet established philosophy, treating, in particular, questions in feminism, finance theory, and technology. He has also published books discussing the possibility of poeticizing philosophy.

His book 'Overwrite: Ethics of Knowledge, Poetics of Existence' (2015, English translation forthcoming) confronts the deplorable state of academia in an explicitly accelerationist way. Not limiting himself to mere criticism, Avanessian is constantly at work constructing alternative platforms such as the summer school he organized with Reza Negarestani and Pete Wolfendale at the Haus der Kulturen der Welt, Berlin, on "Emancipation as Navigation: From the Space of Reasons to the Space of Freedoms."

Art 
Avanessian can also be considered a postcontemporary artist. He uses not only classical publication formats but also art festivals and exhibitions. The 2015 gallery festival "Tomorrow Today / curated by_vienna" for example, was based on Avanessian's homonymous essay and combined the work of twenty curators with the idea of an actual post-capitalism. Within the framework of the ninth Berlin Biennale, Avanessian conducted a ten-day Young Curators Workshop on alternatives to the economic and political models of contemporary art.

Avanessian is a regular contributor to art journals such as Spike, Texte zur Kunst, and DIS Magazine. He also writes frequently about art in philosophical contexts. For several years now, Avanessian has collaborated with the graphic artist, Andreas Töpfer, which has led to publications in print (with Merve and Sternberg Press) and on film.

Radio 
With columnist Georg Diez, media theorist Paul Feigelfeld, and author Julia Zange, Armen Avanessian hosts "60 Hertz", a talk show airing every Monday on Berlin Community Radio. The show is conceived as an artistic rendering, in interviews and conversations, of everyday life in the 2010s. Episodes are usually broadcast in a mix of English and German language.

Film 
With Berlin director Christopher Roth, he has produced the film Hyperstition (2016), which draws on ontology, science fiction, and sociology to question the concept of time. Screened at several festivals in Europe and the United States, the film consists of conversations with established as well as younger philosophers such as Nick Srnicek, Elie Ayache, Ray Brassier and others.

Selected bibliography

Writer 
 Phänomenologie ironischen Geistes Ethik, Poetik und Politik der Moderne. Wilhelm Fink Verlag, 2010, 
 with Anke Henning: Präsens Poetik eines Tempus. Diaphanes, 2012, 
 Present Tense. A Poetics. (together with Anke Hennig), Bloomsbury 2015
 with Anke Hennig: Metanoia Spekulative Ontologie der Sprache. Merve Verlag, 2014, 
 Metanoia: Ontologie der Sprache. (together with Anke Hennig) Berlin: Merve, 2014 (English forthcoming with Bloomsbury)
 with Andreas Töpfer: Speculative Drawing, Sternberg Press, 2014, 
 Speculative Drawing. (together with Andreas Töpfer) Berlin: SternbergPress, 2014
 Überschrift: Ethik des Wissens Poetik der Existenz. Merve Verlag, 2014, 
 Irony and the Logic of Modernity. De Gruyter, 2015, 
 Irony and the Logic of Modernity. DeGruyter, 2015
 Überschreiben. Ethik des Wissens Poetik der Existenz. Berlin: Merve 2015 (English forthcoming with Sternberg Press Berlin)

Publisher 
 Armen Avanessian, Luke Skrebowski: Aesthetics and Contemporary Art. Sternberg Press, 2011, 
 Armen Avanessian, Björn Quiring and Andreas Töpfer: Abyssus Intellectualis. Spekulativer Horror. Merve, 2013, 
 Armen Avanessian : Form Zwischen Ästhetik und künstlerischer Praxis. diaphanes, 
 Armen Avanessian, Gabriele Brandstetter and Franck Hofmann : Die Erfahrung des Orpheus. Wilhelm Fink Verlag, 2010,
 Armen Avanessian, Franck Hofmann : Raum in den Künsten : Konstruktion Bewegung Politik. Wilhelm Fink Verlag, 2010, 
 Armen Avanessian, Winfried Menninghaus and Jan Völker : Vita aesthetica Szenarien ästhetischer Lebendigkeit. diaphanes, 
 Armen Avanessian : #Akzeleration. Merve Verlag, 2013, 
 Armen Avanessian, Jan Niklas Howe : Poetik Historische Narrative, aktuelle Positionen. Kulturverlag Kadmos, 2014, 
 Armen Avanessian, Robin Mackay : #Accelerate The Accelerationist Reader. Merve Verlag, 2014, 
 Armen Avanessian, Anke Hennig and Steffen Popp : Poesie und Begriff, diaphanes. 
 Armen Avanessian, Sophie Wennerscheid : Kierkegaard and Political Theory Religion, Aesthetics, Politics and the Intervention of the Single Individual. Museum Tusculanum Press, 2015, 
 Armen Avanessian, Helen Hester and Jennifer Sophia Theodor (Translation): dea ex machina. Merve Verlag, 2015, 
 Armen Avanessian, Gerald Nestler : Making of Finance. 2015,

References 

1973 births
20th-century Austrian philosophers
20th-century Austrian writers
20th-century essayists
21st-century Austrian philosophers
21st-century Austrian writers
21st-century essayists
Anti-capitalists
Austrian anti-fascists
Austrian essayists
Austrian film producers
Austrian logicians
Austrian non-fiction writers
Continental philosophers
Critical theorists
Epistemologists
Film theorists
Graphic novelists
Hyperreality theorists
Independent scholars
Irony theorists
Literacy and society theorists
Literary theorists
Living people
Mass media theorists
Media critics
Metaphilosophers
Metaphysicians
Metaphysics writers
Ontologists
Phenomenologists
Philosophers of art
Philosophers of culture
Philosophers of economics
Philosophers of education
Philosophers of language
Philosophers of literature
Philosophers of mind
Philosophers of religion
Philosophers of science
Philosophers of social science
Philosophers of technology
Philosophy of time
Political philosophers
Science fiction critics
Austrian social commentators
Social philosophers
Theorists on Western civilization
Writers about activism and social change
Writers from Vienna
Columbia University faculty